Upaya Institute and Zen Center is a center for residential Zen practice located in Santa Fe, New Mexico, and founded by Joan Halifax Roshi. The center focuses on integration of Zen practice with social action, with traditional cultivation of wisdom and compassion in the Buddhist sense. It also provides service in the areas of death and dying, prison work, environment, women's rights and peace work. According to the Upaya website, in 2002 Joan Halifax founded the Prajna Mountain Buddhist Order. A non-profit organization, Prajna is a new Buddhist Order in the lineage of Taizan Maezumi Roshi, the Zen Peacemaker Order and White Plum Asanga.

Gallery

Residency
Upaya offers both short-term and long-term residency for aspiring Zen practitioners.  The resident program is intended for people who wish to practice and learn while living in community at Upaya. A 4 month program with the possibility of making a long term commitment is offered.

See also

Buddhism in the United States
Timeline of Zen Buddhism in the United States

References

External links
 
 Videos of Joan Halifax Roshi giving talks at Upaya

Buddhist temples in New Mexico
Buildings and structures in Santa Fe, New Mexico
White Plum Asanga
Buddhism in New Mexico
Zen centers in the United States